Stenoma niphacma is a moth of the family Depressariidae. It is found in French Guiana.

The wingspan is about 15 mm. The forewings are dark slaty fuscous with the costal edge white from one-fourth onwards and with a white slightly irregular line from before the middle of the costa to two-thirds of the dorsum. There is a narrow white apical patch, attenuated to below the middle of the termen, marked with three blackish dots on the apical edge. The hindwings are rather dark grey.

References

Moths described in 1916
Taxa named by Edward Meyrick
Stenoma